Nurse is a British sitcom broadcast on BBC Two, written by Paul Whitehouse, David Cummings and Esther Coles. It is about a community mental health nurse (Esther Coles) who visits her patients in their homes and is based on the sessions she has with these patients (most of whom are played by Paul Whitehouse), other actors who play patients include Cecilia Noble, Rosie Cavaliero, Simon Day, Jason Maza, Vilma Hollingbery, Jo Enright and Sue Elliot Nichols. The first series started broadcasting on 10 March 2015 and finished broadcasting on 31 March 2015.

References

External links 
 

2015 British television series debuts
2015 British television series endings
2010s British black comedy television series
2010s British comedy-drama television series
2010s British medical television series
2010s British sitcoms
2010s British television miniseries
BBC comedy-drama television shows
BBC high definition shows
BBC television miniseries
BBC television sitcoms
English-language television shows
Television shows set in the United Kingdom